George Calvin Day (November 8, 1871 – November 3, 1940) was a rear admiral of the United States Navy, whose career lasted from the 1890s until the mid-1930s.

Biography
Born in Bradford, Vermont, the son of Hezron George Day, on 8 November 1871, Day graduated from the United States Naval Academy in 1892, was promoted to Ensign on 1 July 1894, Lieutenant (junior grade) on 3 March 1899, and Lieutenant in 1901. He was Executive Officer of  during 1907.

From 1907 to 1909, at the rank of Lieutenant Commander, he served as Navigator of the flagship   and ex officio Fleet Navigator during the 'round the world cruise of the Great White Fleet.  He commanded the destroyer  from 1909 to 1910, and Division 7 of the Torpedo Squadron, Atlantic Fleet, from 1910 to 1911.  He was in charge of the Navy Publicity Bureau in New York City from 1911 to 1913, was Executive Officer of the battleship  from 1914 to 1915, and commanded the armored cruiser  from 1915 to 1916.

By 1917 he was the Head of the Department of Compasses, Nautical Instruments, and Time Service at the Naval Observatory.  During World War I, in the rank of Captain, he commanded the troop transport , formerly the German liner SS Amerika, and was awarded the Navy Cross for this service.  He commanded the armored cruiser  from 1918 to 1919 and the battleship  from 1920 to 1921, and was Commander, Submarines, Pacific, 1923 to 1925.

In 1923 he was a member of the Navy's Court of Inquiry on the Honda Point disaster.  Promoted to Rear Admiral in 1925, he served first as Commandant of the 15th Naval District, and then as Commander of Light Cruiser Division 2 (and ) from June 1927 to April 1928 and Light Cruiser Division 3 (and ) from April 1928 to July 1929.  He was President of the Board of Inspection and Survey in 1929, was a member of the General Board in 1930 and again was President of the Board of Inspection and Survey from 1931 until his retirement in 1935.

Day died in 1940 and was buried at Arlington National Cemetery.

References

1871 births
1940 deaths
United States Navy rear admirals
United States Naval Academy alumni
United States Army personnel of World War I
Recipients of the Navy Cross (United States)
Burials at Arlington National Cemetery